Brandon Lorenzo (born 15 February 1990) is a South African-Canadian television presenter, model, radio personality and music artist. He started his career on MTV Base Africa World Chart Express show, season 2, in South Africa. He is also known for his multiple appearances on the Wendy Williams Show. He is the founder and director of the South African television, model, influencer and legal firm, Lorenzo Management group since 2008.

Filmography

Television

As himself

References

External links
 
Official Instagram
Official Twitter

South African television presenters
Living people
1990 births